Kambal Na Kamao: Madugong Engkwentro is a 1988 Filipino sports film written and directed by comic book writer Carlo J. Caparas. It stars boxing champions Rolando Navarette and Rolando Bohol as two provincial streetfighters who became professional boxers. The film was produced and released by Golden Lion Films in mid-1988. It was given a negative review by film critic Lav Diaz for its uneven and forced storytelling.

Cast
Rolando Navarette
Rolando Bohol
Mia Pratts
Ana Abiera
Deborah Sun
Ruel Vernal
Rudy Meyer
Bomber Moran
Renato del Prado
Rocco Montalban
Robert Miller
Tsing Tong Tsai
Danny Riel
Bebing Amora
Ernie David
Usman Hasim
Danny Labra
Introducing
Twinky and Twinkle the cutest twins
Gabriel Bebot Elorde Jr.
Johnny Elorde
Momong Manaay

Production
According to Rolando Bohol, it was during his first IBF world title defense at the Araneta Coliseum on May 6, 1988 that he and Rolando Navarette, both of whom won their respective bouts that day, were approached by Carlo J. Caparas and Donna Villa of Golden Lion Films for their latest film production Kambal Na Kamao.

Critical response
Lav Diaz, writing for the Manila Standard, gave a negative review of Kambal Na Kamao, writing that the film is a "patchwork of laughs, action, anguished sighs, tragedy, forced scenes and poorly thought-out dialogue", although he mentioned that the boxing scenes are good.

References

External links

1988 films
1980s sports films
Filipino-language films
Philippine sports films
Films directed by Carlo J. Caparas